Enjoy The Times is the sixth album by West London Post punk and Indie band The Times released in 1986.<ref name="Discogs.com"> The Times on Discogs.com]</ref>

Track listing
Side ABritannia Sleeps TonightSomething Like The Truth[Where To Go When The Sun Goes DownTimes TVHousewives LawThink Big!The Third WaveSide BThe American WayWinning Hearts And MindsCousin Frank Goes To HollywoodEnjoyDream Now [Young America]Times RadioWhen The Talking Had To Stop''

References

The Times (band) albums
1986 albums